Rivka Golani (born 22 March 1946) is a world–renowned Israeli-born viola player.
She has performed as soloist with many orchestras throughout the world including the Boston Symphony, Calgary Philharmonic, Royal Concertgebouw, BBC Symphony, BBC Philharmonic, Hong Kong Symphony, Singapore Symphony, Royal Philharmonic, Rotterdam Philharmonic, Israel Philharmonic, Tokyo Metropolitan, Montreal Symphony and the Toronto Symphony. 

Golani has had more repertoire written expressly for her than any violist in the history of classical music. More than 400 pieces have been written for her, including over 90 concertos. 

The BBC Music Magazine included her in its list of the 200 most important instrumentalists and the five most important violists currently concertizing.

In Hungary, she was celebrated as "Musician of the year" by the Artijus Music Foundation in 2011 and awarded the 'Hungarian Classical Disc of the Year', category of the Gramofon Award, in 2013.

She was Ambassador of Canadian Music for the Canadian Music Centre in 2009. 

Golani has been honoured with awards by the Blackfoot First Nations People of Canada. She received The Eagle Feather in 2011 and a Blackfoot appelation: 'Itspankiyakii' - ‘A woman who sings from a high place’ in 2016.

As a teacher, Golani draws students from around the world to her master classes. She holds a professorship at Trinity College of Music in London and has also taught at Birmingham Conservatoire, the University of Toronto, and London's Royal Academy of Music.

Golani received an honourary Doctor of Fine Arts (2013) from Lethbridge University, Canada, for services to classical music.

Biography
Golani was born in Tel Aviv. Her father Yakov Gulnik was from Warsaw, and had lost his family in the Holocaust. Her mother Liza Goldstein was from Polish Galicia. Golani took up the violin at age 7, while her sister Bela learned the cello. Golani was a mathematics prodigy.

Golani became a pupil of the violinist Alexander Moskowsky at age 18. She switched to viola at age 21 and studied with the violist Oedoen Partos, and became a member of the Israel Philharmonic Orchestra. She married the Hungarian luthier Otto Erdesz, and in 1974 the couple moved to Canada, where she gave birth to her son Michael. She became a citizen of Canada in 1983. Erdesz manufactured for her what has been her preferred instrument throughout her career. After their divorce, Golani married German conductor Thomas Sanderling and moved to London. She later returned to Canada briefly before she married again. She currently resides in London with her husband Jeremy Joseph Fox. Golani is also a painter and has exhibited in America, Canada, Israel and the UK.

Golani's CD recordings include the Elgar Cello Concerto arranged for viola with the Royal Philharmonic Orchestra, the Bartok Concerto with the Budapest Symphony, Martinu's Rhapsody Concerto with the Bern Symphony, Chaconne by Pulitzer Prize winner Michael Colgrass with the Toronto Symphony Orchestra, and a three CD set of works by Johann Sebastian Bach arranged for solo viola.

Discography

Arnold, M. Concerto for Viola and Chamber Orchestra, Op. 108. London Musici, Mark Stephenson – Conductor. Conifer Classics 75605-51211-2 (1992, recorded 1991), Conifer Classics 75605 51263 2 (1996)
Bach, J.S. Six Suites for solo Violoncello – transcribed for solo Viola BWV 1007–1012; Bach/Z. Kodály (arr.) Chromatic Fantasy BWV 903; J. S. Bach Chaconne BWV 1004. (2001). MVCD 1141-3 CBC Records.
Bach, J.S. Brandenburg Concertos – Complete Set (No. 6 for two violas & Orchestra), CBC Vancouver Orchestra, Mario Bernardi – Conductor. CBC – SMCD5082
Bach, J.S. Chromatic Fantasia (ed. Kodály) in The History of the Viola on Record, Vol IV.. Pearl – GEMS 0039
Bartók, B. Viola Concerto; Serly Viola Concerto; Rhapsody. Budapest Symphony Orchestra, Andras Ligeti – conductor. (1990). Conifer CDCF-189 (CD)
Bax, A. Fantasy Sonata; J. S. Bach Sonata No. 2; Morawetz Sonata for harp and viola. With Judy Loman – harp. (1994). Marquis ERAD 131
Berlioz,H. Harold in Italy. San Diego Symphony Orchestra, Yoav Talmi – Conductor. Naxos 8.553034
Brahms, J. The Three Piano Quartets. With the Borodin Trio. (1990). 2-Chandos CHAN-8009 (CD)
Brahms, J. Viola Sonata in F minor opus 120, no. 1, Viola Sonata E flat opus 120, no. 2; J. Joachim Variations on an Original Theme (world premier recording) opus 10. with Konstantin Bogino – piano. (1991). Conifer CDCF 199.
Brahms, J. Zwei Gesänge, Op. 91 in "Maureen Forrester", with Maureen Forrester – Contralto and Thomas Muraco – Piano. CBC Records PSCD-2017
Britten, B. Lachrymae. I Musici de Montréal. (1990). Chandos CHAN-8817 (CD)
Cherney, B. Chamber Concerto for Viola and Ten Players. NMC Ens, R. Aitken – conductor. String Trio. Otto Armin – violin, P. Schenkman – violoncello. (1981). RCI 537
Cherney, B. Shekinah for solo viola; In Stillness Ascending, with L. P. Pelletier – piano. (1991). McGill 750036-2
Colgrass,M. Chaconne for Viola & Orchestra (CD also includes Bloch E. Suite Hébraique; Hindemith, P. Trauermusik; Britten, B Lachrymae), with Toronto Symphony Orchestra, Andrew Davis – Conductor. CBC SM-2-5087
Elgar, Sir Edward. Cello Concerto in E minor, opus 85 (Viola transcription: L. Tertis); Bax, Arnold: Phantasy for Viola and Orchestra – 1920. Royal Philharmonic Orchestra, Vernon Handley – conductor. (1988). Conifer CFC-171/CDCF 171
Freedman, H. Opus Pocus. With Robert Aitken – flute, Otto Armin – violin, Peter Schenkman – violoncello. (1983). Centrediscs CMC-0983
Glick, S.I. Music for Passover. Beth Tikvah Synagogue Choir, Beth Tzedec Chor, Kernerman violin, McCartney violin, Miller violoncello, Glick conductor. 4-ACM 34 (CD)
Hatzis, C. Pyrrichean Dances, with Beverley Johnston – Percussion, and Symphony Nova Scotia, Bernhard Gueller – Conductor, CBC Records, SMCD-5243
Koprowski, P. Concerto for Viola and Orchestra. Toronto Symphony, Jukka-Pekka Saraste – conductor. (2001). SMCD 5206
Martinu, B. Rhapsody-Concerto. Bern Symphony Orchestra, Peter Maag – conductor. (1986). Conifer CFC-146
Papineau-Couture, J. Prouesse. (1986). RCI 647
Prokofiev, S. Overture on Hebrew Themes OP. 34 – with the Borodin Trio and James Campbell. CHAN-8924
Rubbra, E. Concerto in A for viola and orchestra, opus 75; Little violin. (1994). Royal Philharmonic Orchestra, Vernon Handley – Conductor. Conifer CDCF 225
Schumann, R. Märchenerzählungen. With J. Campbell – clarinet, William Tritt – piano. (1986). RCI 637
Schumann, R. Fairly Tales Op. 113; 3 Romances Op. 94; 5 Pieces in Folk Style Op. 102; Fairy Tale Narrations with clarinet Op. 132. With Joaquín Valdepeñas – clarinet. Bernadene – Blaha piano. (1999). MVCD 1127
Sohal, N. Shades IV in Chamber Music Vol. I – MERUCD001
Weill, K. Kiddush (in The London Viola Sound); viola solo and 48 violas from London orchestras, Geoffrey Simon – Conductor, CALA Records – CACD0106
Yuasa, Joji. Eye on Genesis – Revealed Time for Viola & Orchestra. Tokyo Metropolitan Orchestra, Hiroyuki Iwaki – Conductor. FOCD-2508
Zehavi, O. Concerto for Viola * Orchestra. Haifa Symphony Orchestra, Stanley Sperber – Conductor. MII-CD-22
Zuckert, L. Shepherd's Sadness, Lento Triste. With Patricia Parr – piano. (1986). Jubal 5007

Compilations
The Viola Volume I: Grigoras Dinicu: Hora Staccato; Gabriel Faure: Après un Rêve Op. 7; Claude Debussy: Romance; Antonín Dvořák: Bagatelle No. 3 Henry Purcell: Aria; Enrique Granados – Spanish Dance, Op. 37 No. 2 "Oriental" (12 Spanish Danses); Johannes Brahms: Hungarian Dance No. 1 – Hungarian Dance No. 3 in F Major; Arthur Benjamin: Jamaican Rumba; Modest Petrovich Mussorgsky – Hopak; Christoph Willibald Gluck: Melody from Orfeo; Richard Heuberger: Midnight Bells; Fritz Kreisler: Liebesleid – Schön Rosmarin; Carl Maria von Weber: Andante and Hungarian Rondo in C minor. J. 79.
The Viola Volumes II & III: Franz Schubert: Sonata in A minor for Arpeggione and Piano; Robert Schumann: Märchenbilder, Op. 113; Joachim: Hebrew Melodies (Impressions of Byron's Poems), Op. 9; Brahms: Sonata F minor Op. 120, No. 1; Dmitri Shostakovich: Sonata for Viola and Piano Op. 147. Samuel Sanders – piano. 1984-5. 2-Masters of the Bow MBS-2021-2
Viola Nouveau: Works by Barnes – Cherney – Jaeger – O. Joachim – Prévost. (1983). Centrediscs CMC-0883/(Prévost) 6-ACM 28
 Prouesse: Works by Jaeger – Tittle – Mozetich – Papineau-Couture – Southam. Centrediscs CMC-4492
 Rivka Golani: Works by MacIntosh – Harmon – Hiscott – Colgrass. Centrediscs CMC-5798
 I Heard a Voice from Heaven – Jewish Devotional Music of 18th – 20th Centuries, Cantor Louis Danto with pianist Lawrence Pitchko, Cadenza Records, Toronto, Canada.
 Rivka Golani Encores: Works by Brahms, Kreisler, Paganini, Gluck, Rachmaninov, von Weber, Wieniawski, Massenet, Godowsky (Heifetz), Dinicu (Heifetz) and Bruch, with Michelle Levin, Piano, Hungaroton Classic HCD 32645

References

External links
Canadian Music Encyclopedia article on Rivka Golani
https://web.archive.org/web/20140103012204/http://mgam.com/artist/rivka-golani/
http://www.foxjones.com/rivka.html

1946 births
People from Tel Aviv
Canadian classical violists
Israeli classical violists
Women violists
Living people